St. John's Church Complex is a historic  Episcopal church complex at 136 Main Street in Delhi, Delaware County, New York. The complex consists of the church / chapel, parish house, rectory, rectory garage, connecting stairway, and site of the 1831 church. The centerpiece is the 1887-1888 Richardsonian Romanesque style Sheldon Memorial Chapel.

It was added to the National Register of Historic Places in 1995.

See also
National Register of Historic Places listings in Delaware County, New York

References

Episcopal church buildings in New York (state)
Churches on the National Register of Historic Places in New York (state)
National Register of Historic Places in Delaware County, New York
Churches completed in 1831
19th-century Episcopal church buildings
Churches in Delaware County, New York
Romanesque Revival church buildings in New York (state)